This is a list of former and current castles and fortifications in South Africa and contains historical fortifications, military instillations, mock castles and Manor Houses, that may be referred to as "castles". A fortification or Fort is easily identifiable as a structure built purely for defensive purposes, however a castle is slightly more subjective. The historical term castle refers to a Fortification that was also a seat of power and governance over the local area, the modern term might refer to a Manor House, a Châteaux or a Mansion and is more a matter of semantics. The castles will be discussed by province.

Eastern Cape
 Fort Beaufort
 Fort Cox
 Fort Hare
 Fort Armstrong
 Fort Glamorgan
 Fort Murray
 Fort White
 Fort Peddie
 Fort Frederick
 Fort Selwyn

Free State
 Naval Hill
 Fort Drury
 Fort Bloemfontein a.k.a. The Queen’s Fort
 Harrismith Blockhouse
 Jacobsdal Blockhouse
 Riverford Blockhouse
 Old Presidency, Bloemfontein.

Gauteng
 Pretoria Forts including Fort Schanskop, Fort Wonderboompoort, Fort Klapperkop and Fort Daspoortrand (a.k.a. Westfort).
 Erasmus Castle
 Castle Kyalami
 Johannesburg Fort
 Zwartkoppies Hall the Mansion built by entrepreneur Sammy Marks.
 Palace of Justice
 Mahlamba Ndlopfu a.k.a. 'Libertas' is the Pretoria residence of the President.
 Parktown mansions

Kwazulu-Natal
 Fort Durnford
 uMgungundlovu
 Fort Amiel
 Fort Mistake
 Fort Nongqayi
 Fort Nottingham

Limpopo

 Die Skans Fort built by Joao Albasini
 Fort Botha
 Fort Edward
 Fort Hendrina
 Fort Louis Campbell
 Mapungubwe
 Zoutpansbergdorp Fort a.k.a. Schoemansdal Fort

Mpumalanga
 Voortrekker Fort, Ohrigstad.
 Fort Merensky, a.k.a. Fort Wilhelm.
 Fort Burgers
 Fort Weeber

North West
 Potchefstroom Fort
 Fountain Villa
 Voortrekker Fort, Elandsfontein
 Roets House
 Rectors Residence
 Boekenhoutfontein
 Fort on Cannon Kopje

Northern Cape

 Leeu-Gamka Blockhouse
 Carnarvon Blockhouse
 Prieska Kopje Blockhouse
 Letterklip
 Hospital Hill Blockhouse
 Danielskuil Blockhouse

Western Cape
 Castle of Good Hope
 Redoubt Duijnhoop
 Fortifications of the Cape Peninsula
 Welgeluk Ostrich Palace, home to an 'Ostrich Baron'
 Greylands Ostrich Palace, home to an 'Ostrich Baron'
 Gottland House, home to an 'Ostrich Baron'
 146 High Street, Oudtshoorn, home to an 'Ostrich Baron'
 Pinehurst, home to an 'Ostrich Baron'
 Robben Island was fortified during the Second World War.
 Fort de Goede Hoop

Townhouses in Cape Town
 Leinster Hall, Cape Town
 Ruth Prowse School of Art, Elson Road, Woodstock, Cape Town
 Rust en Vreugd
 122 Bree Street, Cape Town
 Jan de Waal House
 Koopmans-de Wet House
 Ravenswood
 Tuynhuys is the former Cape Town residence of the President.
 Groote Schuur is the Cape Town residence of the President.
 Leeuwenhof,  Gardens, Cape Town. The residence of the  Premier of the Western Cape.
 Groot Constantia
 Genadendal Residence

Blockhouses of the Second Anglo-Boer War

 Aliwal North Blockhouses (2)
 Broederstroom Blockhouse
 Burgersdorp Blockhouse
 Dewetsville Blockhouse
 Fort Harlech, Krugersdorp
 Hekpoort Blockhouse
 Hopetown Blockhouse
 Kaalfontein/Zuurfontein Blockhouse
 Modder River Blockhouse
 Noupoort Blockhouse
 Orange River Station
 Pampoennek Blockhouse
 Prieska Blockhouse
 Riversford Blockhouse
 The Reservoir Blockhouse
 The Stormberg Junction South Blockhouse
 Timeball Hill Blockhouse
 The Warrenton Railway Bridge Blockhouse
 Warmbaths Blockhouse
 Witkop Blockhouse

See also

 South African Heritage Resources Agency
 South African National Museum of Military History
 Provincial heritage site (South Africa)
 Military history of South Africa
 List of castles in Africa
 History of South Africa
 List of castles
 List of forts

References

 
Fortifications in South Africa
Castles
South Africa